Sahitya Akademi Translation Prizes are given each year to writers for their outstanding translations work in the 24 languages, since 1989.

Recipients
Following is the list of recipients of Sahitya Akademi translation prizes for their works written in Bengali. The award, as of 2019, consisted of 50,000.

See also 
 List of Sahitya Akademi Award winners for Bengali

References

External links
 Akademi Translation Prizes For Bengali Language

Bengali
Indian literary awards